Nevada Fall is a  high waterfall on the Merced River in Yosemite National Park, California. It is located below the granite dome, Liberty Cap, at the west end of Little Yosemite Valley. The waterfall is widely recognized by its "bent" shape, in which the water free-falls for roughly the first third of its length to a steep slick-rock slope. This mid-fall impact of the water on the cliff face creates a turbulent, whitewater appearance in the fall and produces a great deal of mist which covers a wide radius, which led to its current name (Nevada is a Spanish word meaning "snowy").

The Indian name was Yo-wy-we, signifying the twist or squirm of the falling water. Lafayette Bunnell suggested the name "Nevada" for the waterfall. He wrote, "The Nevada Fall was so called because it was the nearest to the Sierra Nevada, and because the name was sufficiently indicative of a wintry companion for our spring (Vernal Fall)... The white, foaming water, as it dashed down Yo-wy-we from the snowy mountains, represented to my mind a vast avalanche of snow."

The Emerald Pool forms on the "step" between Nevada Fall and Vernal Fall downstream. They form a cascade in which the Merced River flows down to Yosemite Valley.

This cascade is sometimes called the giant staircase, which is evident when viewed from above, at Glacier Point.

One must first hike to Vernal Fall and then trek another  to reach the top. The John Muir Trail, which starts near the trail to Happy Isles, goes to the top of Nevada Fall.

Hazards 
In spite of the dangers and deaths as recently as June 2013, the pool above Nevada Fall remains a popular swimming location, with no park restrictions. In June 2018, an 18-year-old man fell to his death from the edge of the fall while attempting to take a selfie.

References

External links 

Waterfalls of Yosemite National Park
Merced River
Waterfalls of Mariposa County, California
Horsetail waterfalls